Edgar Gardner Murphy (1869–1913) was an American clergyman and author during the Progressive Era in the United States who worked to improve relations between African Americans and whites and wrote about issues faced, as well as working to improve child labor laws and public education.

Murphy was born at Fort Smith, Arkansas, graduated from the University of the South in 1889, and served as a priest of the Episcopal Church for twelve years. After 1903, he worked exclusively in educational and social work. Murphy served as executive secretary of the Southern Education Board, vice president of the Conference for Education in the South, organizer and secretary of the Southern Society for Consideration of Race Problems and Conditions in the South, and organizer and first secretary of the National Child Labor Committee.

Books
 Words for the Church (1896)  
 The Larger Life (1896)  
 Problems of the Present South (1904; second edition, 1909)  
 The Basis of Ascendency (1909)

See also
 William Porcher DuBose

References

Further reading

 Luker, Ralph. A Southern Tradition in Theology and Social Criticism, 1830-1930: The Religious Liberalism and Social Conservatism of James Warley Miles, William Porcher DuBose, and Edgar Gardner Murphy. Mellen Press (1984) , .

 Wood, Betsy. Upon the Altar of Work: Child Labor and the Rise of a New American Sectionalism (U. of Illinois Press, 2020) pp 51-83. 

1869 births
Murphy, Edgar Gardner
Murphy, Edgar Gardner
Murphy, Edgar Gardner
Murphy, Edgar Gardner
Progressive Era in the United States
19th-century American Episcopalians

Human rights activists